Oberea hanoiensis is a species of beetle in the family Cerambycidae. It was described by Maurice Pic in 1923.

References

hanoiensis
Beetles described in 1923